Federico Gana (January 15, 1867 – April 22, 1926) was a Chilean writer and diplomat from Santiago, Chile.

Biography
Gana was the older son of Federico Gana Munizaga y Rosario Gana Castro, and first cousin of the descendants of Albero Blest Gana, the preeminent Chilean novelist. He began his secondary education in the Linares lyceum in 1878, where he spent his first year, and completed the remainder at the National Institute. He obtained his law degree from the University of Chile in 1890, but practiced law only for a short period of time.

He lived principally in Santiago and in San Bernardo. In October 1890, his first published work, the short story "¡Pobre vieja!" appeared in the weekly La Actualidad, under the pseudonym Pedro Simple. At the end of that year, Gana was named Second Secretary of the Chilean legation to London, a charge that ended with the fall of the Balmaceda government.

Freed from his diplomatic work, he traveled to France, Belgium, and Holland, where he came into contact with the works of Flaubert, Balzac, and Ivan Turgenev, the lattermost impressing him profoundly. Upon his return to Chile, in 1892, he disseminated the works of the Russian novelist throughout literary circles.

In 1894, Gana published another short story, this time in publication El año Literario, that was initially titled "Por un perro," but later came to be called "Un carácter." In July 1897, La Revista Literaria published the story "Una mañana de invierno, later known as "La Maiga," with which Gana began the current of criollismo rural in the country.

In 1903, he married Blanca Subercaseux del Río, with whom he had six children. The same year he participated, along with his friend Baldomero Lillo, in a literary competition organized by the Catholic Review, submitting the stories "La Señora," “En las montañas," and "La Maiga." He also began contributing to the literary magazine Zig-Zag in 1906, publishing his Manchas de color in 1914.

A great number of his works circulated in a diverse array of newspapers, including La Revista Nueva, Sucesos, Silueta Magazine, El Mercurio, La Nación, Atenea, Las Últimas Noticias.

Following a brief hospitalization in San Vincente's Hospital in Santiago, he died in 1926.

Literary analysis
Studies of the character and evolution of the Chilean short story have established categorically that Federico Gana is the authentic discoverer of the Chilean countryside as a theme of national literature.

Coming from the modernista envirornment of the end of the 19th century, his early stories reveal a natural vacillation between the subjective and fleeting tendency that inspired modernism, and the utilization of the concrete motives offered by the natural environment of the countryside. In this manner, with his first published story in 1890, "¡Pobre vieja!" he subtly reveals his interest in vernacular literary elements; the same occurs with "Por un perro," in 1894. It is in this year that he wrote "En otro tiempo," later known as "Pesadillas," in which he adopts an extremely modernist tone.

In 1897, he published "The Maiga," with the name of "Días de campo: Una mañana de invierno,” a story which shows his definitive association with the movement of criollismo. The date serves well as a point of departure for this movement, which at that time enjoyed great representation in the works of the nation and within the whole of the literature of Latin America.

Yet this first rapprochement of the Chilean countryside, which Gana experienced firsthand during his childhood summer vacations to the country near and around Linares, does not reveal the depth and concern of Baldomero Lillo and other subsequent criollistas. Nourished by the works of Turgenev, with whom he shared an aesthetic similitude, the creative attitude of Ferderico Gana reflects a tendency of gentle reverie, with a style always dignified and clean. This harmony reflects a serene and intimate vision of the Chilean countryside in its patriarchal aspect, with its peasants and elderly, full of resignation and reverential respect for authority.

“La señora" y "Paulita," are, without a doubt, Gana's greatest achievements; they reflect all of the noble virtues that characterize his narrative and poetic work. There appears the sharp landscape of the Valle Central, and the man of the land, below a gaze both kind and understanding.

References

Chilean male writers
1926 deaths
1867 births